The State Bank Building is a historic bank building located at 102 W. Main St. in Collinsville, Illinois. Built in 1916, the bank was the third used by the State Bank, which was chartered in 1891. Architect Robert G. Kirsch designed the building in the Classical Revival style. The building's north and east facades are faced with Amicoloa marble. The front entrance is located on the north side, which has three arched bays flanked by Ionic columns. The facade is topped by an entablature, a dentillated cornice, and a marble parapet. The five bays on the building's east side are similar to the front bays; six Ionic pilasters flank these bays.

The building was added to the National Register of Historic Places on April 23, 2010.

References

Bank buildings on the National Register of Historic Places in Illinois
Neoclassical architecture in Illinois
Commercial buildings completed in 1916
National Register of Historic Places in Madison County, Illinois
Buildings and structures in Madison County, Illinois